Paul Allen (February 15, 1775 – August 18, 1826) was an American poet, historian, and editor.

Born in Providence, Rhode Island, Allen studied at Brown University, graduating in 1793. He later relocated to Philadelphia, where he served as editor of The Port Folio, the Gazette of the United States, and the Federal Republican. While in Philadelphia, he edited a two-volume history of the Lewis and Clark Expedition, published in 1814 in that city, but without mention of the actual author, banker Nicholas Biddle.

Allen reached the height of his reputation after he moved to Baltimore, where he served as editor of the short-lived Journal of the Times and the more-successful Baltimore Morning Chronicle. He also joined the Delphian Club, where he earned the playful "clubicular" name of Solomon Fitz Quizz and the title of Professor of Loblology, which was defined as "the science of endeavoring to do that which is impossible." He proposed publishing A History of the American Revolution, but relied on fellow Delphians John Neal and Dr. Tobias Watkins to write all but the preface to satisfy the subscribers to its publication in 1819. His hundred-page epic poem Noah (1821) was considered at the time to be a significant achievement in American literature.

Allen died in 1826, at which time he was still editor of the Baltimore Morning Chronicle.

References

 Allen, Paul, The Life of Charles Brockden Brown, 1814 (facsimile ed., 1975, Scholars' Facsimiles & Reprints).

External links
 
 
 

American book editors
Writers from Providence, Rhode Island
1775 births
1826 deaths
People of colonial Rhode Island
American male poets
19th-century American poets
19th-century American male writers
American male non-fiction writers
Writers from Baltimore
19th-century American newspaper editors
American poets
American non-fiction writers
19th-century American non-fiction writers
Journalists from Maryland
Writers from Maryland

Brown University alumni
Lewis and Clark Expedition people